Newcomb Township is a township in Champaign County, Illinois, USA.  As of the 2020 census, its population was 1,377 and it contained 526 housing units.

Geography
Newcomb is Township 21 North, Range 7 East of the Third Principal Meridian.

Illinois Route 47 crosses the township from north to south. U.S. Route 136 forms the northern boundary. The historically registered Hazen Bridge crosses the Sangamon River in the eastern part of this township.

Cities and towns
 Fisher (southwest quarter)

Demographics
As of the 2020 census there were 1,377 people, 415 households, and 355 families residing in the township. The racial makeup of the township was 93.90% White, 0.51% African American, 0.07% Native American, 1.31% Asian, 0.00% Pacific Islander, 0.29% from other races, and 3.92% from two or more races. Hispanic or Latino of any race were 2.03% of the population.

There were 415 households, out of which 32.50% had children under the age of 18 living with them, 76.14% were married couples living together, 0.48% had a female householder with no spouse present, and 14.46% were non-families. 12.30% of all households were made up of individuals, and 4.80% had someone living alone who was 65 years of age or older. The average household size was 2.83 and the average family size was 3.07.

The township's age distribution consisted of 25.5% under the age of 18, 7.0% from 18 to 24, 13.9% from 25 to 44, 32.7% from 45 to 64, and 20.8% who were 65 years of age or older. The median age was 45.8 years. For every 100 females, there were 120.5 males. For every 100 females age 18 and over, there were 119.3 males.

The median income for a household in the township was $119,313, and the median income for a family was $119,188. Males had a median income of $81,000 versus $29,018 for females. The per capita income for the township was $48,454. About 1.1% of families and 0.7% of the population were below the poverty line.

Natural gas storage area

Cemeteries
The township contains these cemeteries: Naylor, Shiloh (Section 22, formerly Pancake Point), Phillippe (Section 36).

Major highways
  Illinois State Route 47

Airports and landing strips
 Furtney Airport

History
Newcomb Township was created as a civil township in 1860, after Champaign County adopted the township form of government, and originally comprised two survey townships. It is said to have been named after Joseph Newcomb, an early settler. The eastern half of Newcomb Township was set off in 1867 to create Condit Township. An early post office in northwest Condit Township, near Fisher, was called Newcomb.

References
 
 United States Census Bureau cartographic boundary files

External links
 US-Counties.com
 City-Data.com
 Illinois State Archives

Townships in Champaign County, Illinois
Townships in Illinois
1859 establishments in Illinois
Populated places established in 1859